Searchlight Pictures (previously known as Fox Searchlight Pictures) is an American film production company and a subsidiary of Walt Disney Studios, a division of Disney Entertainment, which is owned by the Walt Disney Company. Founded in 1994 as Fox Searchlight Pictures for 20th Century Fox (later 20th Century Studios), the studio focuses primarily on producing, distributing, and acquiring specialty films. Walt Disney Studios Home Entertainment distributes the films produced by Searchlight in home media under the 20th Century Home Entertainment banner.

Searchlight films include Slumdog Millionaire, 12 Years a Slave, Birdman or (The Unexpected Virtue of Ignorance), The Shape of Water and Nomadland, all of which won an Academy Award for Best Picture. Other Best Picture nominations include The Full Monty, Sideways, Little Miss Sunshine, Juno, Black Swan, 127 Hours, The Tree of Life, The Descendants, Beasts of the Southern Wild, The Grand Budapest Hotel, Brooklyn, Three Billboards Outside Ebbing, Missouri, The Favourite, Jojo Rabbit, Nightmare Alley, and The Banshees of  Inisherin. The studio has grossed over $5.3 billion worldwide and amassed 28 Golden Globe Awards, 51 BAFTA awards, and 46 Academy Awards. Slumdog Millionaire is the studio's largest commercial success, with over $377 million (US) of box office receipts, against a production budget of only $15 million.

Searchlight Pictures was one of the 21st Century Fox film production companies that was acquired by Disney on March 20, 2019. The studio's current name was adopted on January 17, 2020 in order to avoid confusion with Fox Corporation.

History

Before creation of Searchlight 

Prior to the creation of Searchlight, 20th Century Fox was active in the specialty film market, releasing independent and specialty films under the banner of 20th Century-Fox International Classics, later renamed 20th Century-Fox Specialized Film Division, then TLC Films. The most notable of the releases under these banners include Suspiria, Bill Cosby: Himself, Eating Raoul, The Gods Must Be Crazy, Reuben, Reuben, and Ziggy Stardust and the Spiders from Mars.

In the early 1990s, 20th Century Fox executives decided to emulate the commercial success of Disney's newly acquired Miramax studio. In 1994, 20th announced the formation of a subsidiary that would drive their entry into the specialty film market, and in July that year, they brought in Thomas Rothman, then president of production at The Samuel Goldwyn Company, to head up the new subsidiary. It was soon given the name Fox Searchlight Pictures, with Rothman as its founding president. The new company inherited the familiar branding elements associated with 20th Century Fox; Fox Searchlight films opened with a production logo consisting of the Fox Searchlight name presented as a large monolith, illuminated by the eponymous searchlights and accompanied by the 20th Century Fox fanfare composed by Alfred Newman.

First years and 21st Century Fox era 
From its first release, The Brothers McMullen (1995), Fox Searchlight went to distribute a series of independent films such as Girl 6, Stealing Beauty, and She's the One (all 1996). While critically well received, these early releases were not commercially very successful; Fox Searchlight's first real commercial breakthrough came with The Full Monty (1997), garnering the studio's first awards.

In 2006, a companion label, Fox Atomic, was created to produce and/or distribute genre films. Fox Atomic closed down in 2009.

On June 28, 2012, Rupert Murdoch announced that Searchlight's parent company News Corporation would be split into two publishing and media oriented companies: a new News Corporation, which takes on the publishing and Australian broadcasting assets, and 21st Century Fox, which operated the Fox Entertainment Group and 20th Century Fox until its acquisition by The Walt Disney Company. Murdoch considered the name of the new company a way to maintain the 20th Century Fox's heritage.

Fox Stage Productions was formed in June 2013. The creation of 21st Century Fox was completed on June 28, 2013. In August 2013, 20CF started a theatrical joint venture with a trio of producers, both film and theater, Kevin McCollum, John Davis and Tom McGrath.

Disney era 
On December 14, 2017, The Walt Disney Company agreed to acquire most assets from 21st Century Fox, including Fox Searchlight, for $52.4 billion. After a bid from Comcast (parent company of NBCUniversal) for $65 billion, Disney counterbid with $71.3 billion. On July 19, 2018, Comcast dropped out of the bid for 21st Century Fox in favor of Sky plc and Sky UK. Eight days later, Disney and 21st Century Fox shareholders approved the merger between the two companies. On March 12, 2019, Disney announced it has set to close the Fox deal on March 20. On March 19, 2019, 21st Century Fox spun off the remaining assets, including the Fox Broadcasting Company, Fox Television Stations, Fox News Channel, Fox Business, Fox Sports 1 and 2, Fox Deportes, and the Big Ten Network into the newly formed Fox Corporation in preparation for final consummation of the sale. On the next day, the sale was completed. After trying a day, Disney set film leadership lineup.

As of November 2019, FX Networks and Fox Searchlight were assigned to supply Hulu with content. On January 17, 2020, it was announced that the "Fox" name would be dropped from several of the Fox assets that were acquired by Disney, shortening the company's name to "Searchlight Pictures", in order to avoid brand confusion with the Fox Corporation.

More recently, Nancy Utley has officially left Searchlight Pictures after six months, to launch Lake Ellyn Entertainment, and struck a first look deal with Chernin Entertainment.

Film library

Accolades 
Since 1994, Searchlight Pictures has accumulated 174 Academy Award nominations with 46 wins (including five Best Picture winners since 2009), 117 Golden Globe nominations with 28 wins, 173 BAFTA nominations with 51 wins, 66 Screen Actors Guild Award nominations with 12 wins, 215 Critics Choice Award nominations with 55 wins, and 137 Independent Spirit Awards nominations with 54 wins.

Related units

Searchlight Television 

Searchlight Television is the television production division of Searchlight Pictures. Launched in April 2018, Searchlight Television broadens the variety of projects produced under the Searchlight banner. It is headed by David Greenbaum and Matthew Greenfield.

Both original material and adaptations of Searchlight's existing film library will be produced for cable, streaming and broadcast television, in the form of documentaries, scripted series, limited series and more.  In April 2019, the Hulu streaming service ordered The Dropout, starring Amanda Seyfried from Searchlight Television and 20th Television. The studio is also developing an adaptation of the City of Ghosts novel with ABC Signature and an adaptation of N. K. Jemisin's Inheritance Trilogy with Westbrook Studios. In October 2021, Hulu ordered a sequel series to the Mel Brooks film History of the World, Part I from Searchlight Television and 20th Television.

Searchlight Shorts 
In March 2019, the studio launched Searchlight Shorts, a collection of short films that the studio would acquire from upper-tier festivals and release on their YouTube channel. The first two films to be acquired by the studio for this collection were Shelly Lauman's Birdie and Guy Nattiv's Skin, the latter of which won the 2018 Academy Award for Best Live Action Short Film. Other acquisitions for the collection included A.V. Rockwell's Feathers, Matthew Puccini's Lavender, Freddy Macdonald's Sew Torn,  Savanah Leaf and Taylor Russell's The Heart Still Hums and Julia Baylis and Sam Guest's Wiggle Room.

See also 
 20th Century Studios
 Touchstone Television

Notes

References 
Citations

Sources

External links 
 

American companies established in 1994
Film distributors of the United States
Film production companies of the United States
Entertainment companies based in California
Companies based in Los Angeles
Mass media companies established in 1994
Entertainment companies established in 1994
1994 establishments in California
American independent film studios
20th Century Studios
Walt Disney Studios (division)
Disney acquisitions
Disney production studios
Former News Corporation subsidiaries